A Deputy Commissioner or Collector-cum-District Magistrate is an union civil service officer of the Indian Administrative Service (IAS) cadre who is responsible for land revenue collection, canal revenue collection and law & order maintenance of a District. Collector cum District Magistrate  come under the general supervision of divisional commissioners wherever the latter post exists. India has 748 districts as of 2021. However, senior officers from state civil services can also be appointed as DC or DM. Generally, an IAS Officer becomes DC or DM after 5/6 years of his service. However, state public service officers in general takes minimum 15 years to 18 years (varies from State to State) to become DM or DC.

History 
The current district administration in India is a legacy of the British Raj, with the  Collector cum District Magistrate being the chief administrative officer of the District. 

Warren Hastings introduced the office of the District Collector in the Judicial Plan of 1772. By the Judicial Plan of 1774, the office of the Collector cum District Magistrate was temporarily renamed Diwan. The name, Collector, derived from their being head of the revenue organization (tax collection) for the district. With the passage of the Government of India Act 1858, by the British Parliament. The designation of Collector cum District Magistrate  is held by any central civil servant who is a  member of the Indian Administrative  Service cadre and were charged with supervising general administration in the district. 

Sir George Campbell, lieutenant-governor of Bengal from 1871 to 1874, intended "to render the heads of districts no longer the drudges of many departments and masters of none, but in fact the general controlling authority over all departments in each district."

The office of a collector during the British Raj held multiple responsibilities as collector, he was the head of the revenue organization, charged with registration, alteration, and partition of holdings; the settlement of disputes; the management of indebted estates; loans to agriculturists, and famine relief. As district magistrate, he exercised general supervision over the inferior courts and in particular, directed the police work. The office was meant to achieve the "peculiar purpose" of collecting revenue and of keeping the peace. The superintendent of police (SP), inspector general of jails, the surgeon general, the divisional forest officer (DFO) and the Executive Engineer PWD (EE) had to inform the collector of every activity in their departments.

Until the later part of the nineteenth century, no native was eligible to become a district collector. But with the introduction of open competitive examinations for the Indian Civil Service, the office was opened to natives. Romesh Chandra Dutt, Sripad Babaji Thakur, Anandaram Baruah, Krishna Govinda Gupta and Brajendranath De were the first five Indian ICS officers to become Collectors.

The district continued to be the unit of administration after India gained independence in 1947. The role of the district collector remained largely unchanged, except for the separation of most judicial powers to judicial officers of the district. Later, with the promulgation of the National Extension Services and Community Development Programme by the Nehru government in 1952, the district collector was entrusted with the additional responsibility of implementing the Government of India's development programs in the district.

Nomenclature 

The different names of the office are a legacy of the varying administration systems in British India. While the powers exercised by the officer were mostly the same throughout the country, the preferred name often reflected his primary role in the particular province. In the Bengal Presidency, the post was called District Magistrate and Collector whereas in the Bombay Presidency and Central Provinces, it was known simply as the District Collector even though he was also the District Magistrate. In the Madras Presidency, it was often known simply as Collector.

Law and order was an important subject in the United Provinces and the post continues to be known as the District Magistrate in present-day Uttar Pradesh. In non-regulation provinces like Punjab, Burma, Assam and Oudh, a simpler form of administration prevailed with many elements of the Criminal Procedure Code suspended and the DM functioning as the District and Sessions Judge as well. Here the post was known as Deputy Commissioner, due to these provinces having a Chief Commissioner who took the place of the usual Governor and High Court and exercised both executive and judicial functions.

Post Independence, the different names have continued even though the role and powers of the DM are almost the same throughout India.

Deputy Commissioner (DC)- In India, some states use the term "Deputy Commissioner" instead of "District Magistrate" to refer to the head of the district administration. These states are Karnataka, Assam, Meghalaya, Mizoram, Nagaland, Tripura, Jammu and Kashmir, Punjab, Haryana, Delhi,Himachal Pradesh, Jharkhand, Arunachal Pradesh, etc.
District Collector (DC)- In India, some states use the term "District Collector" instead of "District Magistrate" to refer to the head of the district administration. These states include Kerala, Tamil Nadu, Telengana, Andhra Pradesh, Goa, Maharashtra, Sikkim, Odisha, Gujarat, Maharashtra, Puducherry and Lakshadweep
District Magistrate (DM)- some states use the term "District Magistrate" to refer to the head of the district administration. These states are Uttar Pradesh, Madhya Pradesh, Uttarakhand, West Bengal, Rajasthan, Bihar,Chhattisgarh, etc.
Furthermore, the responsibilities and powers of the District Magistrate, Deputy Commissioner, and District Collector are almost the same, and they perform similar functions. They are responsible for the overall administration of the district, including law and order, revenue collection, and implementation of government schemes. They also act as the executive magistrate, responsible for maintaining law and order and ensuring the safety and security of the people.

The reason for the use of different terms in different states is historical, and it is based on the administrative setup and traditions of the respective states. However, despite the differences in terminology, the role and responsibilities of these officials are largely similar.

Posting 
They are posted by the state government, from among the pool of Indian Administrative Service (IAS) officers, who either are on Level 11, Level 12 or Level 13 of the Pay Matrix, in the state. The members of the IAS are either directly recruited by the Union Public Service Commission, promoted from State Civil Service (SCS) or nominated from Non-State Civil Service (Non-SCS). The direct recruits are posted as collectors after five to six years of service, whereas the promoted members from state civil services generally occupy this post after promotion to the IAS, which generally happens after two decades of service. A district magistrate and collector is transferred to and from the post by the state government. The office bearer is generally of the rank of under secretary/deputy secretary or director in Government of India.

Functions and responsibilities 
The responsibilities assigned to a district magistrate vary from state to state, but generally, collectors, under the general supervision of divisional commissioners (where such a post exists), are entrusted with a wide range of duties in the jurisdiction of the district, generally involving the following:

As District Magistrate 
 Issuance of adoption orders under the provisions of the Juvenile Justice Act, 2015 with provision of appeal to divisional commissioners.
 Granting arms and ammunition licence under Arms Act with provision of appeal to divisional commissioners.
 Granting license to cinemas with provision of appeal to divisional commissioners.
 Heads the district disaster management authority constituted under the Disaster Management Act, 2005.
 Conducts criminal court of executive magistrate.
 Maintenance of law and order.
 Supervision of subordinate executive magistracy and conduct magisterial inquiries.
 Hearing cases under the preventive section of the Criminal Procedure Code.
 Supervision of jails and certification of execution of capital sentences.
 Inspection of police stations, prisons and juvenile homes in the district.
 Authorising parole orders to inmates.
 Prepares panel of names for appointment of public prosecutors and additional public prosecutors with consultation with session judge in district.
 Disaster management during natural calamities such as floods, famines or epidemics.
 Crisis management during riots or external aggression.
 Child Labour/bonded labour related matters.

As District Collector 
 Conducts revenue court.
 Arbitrator of land acquisition, its assessment and collection of land revenue.
 Collection of income tax dues, excise duties, irrigation dues and its arrears.
 Registration of Property documents, sale deeds, power of attorneys, defacement, share certificates etc.
 Issue various kinds of statutory certificates including SC/ST, OBC & EWC, Domicile, Nationality, Marriage, etc.
 Relief and rehabilitation.
 Custodian of evacuee and migrant property
 Inspection of various district offices, sub divisions and tehsils.

Other Functions 
 Head of land and revenue administration
 District head of the executive magistracy and overall supervision of law and order and security and chief protocol officer
 Licensing and Regulatory Authority (such as Arms Act) 
 The conduct of elections 
 Disaster management
 Public service delivery
 Chief Information and Grievance Redressal Officer

Separation from judiciary
While almost all of the 741 Indian districts are headed by DMs, constitutional developments post Independence in 1947 have led to a reduction in power and realignment of roles for the District Magistrate. The first major change came about in the early 1960s as the Judiciary was separated from the Executive in most Indian states in line with Article 50 of the Constitution of India. This meant that DMs and SDMs could no longer try criminal cases or commit accused to Sessions Court. Their place was taken by Chief Judicial Magistrates and Sub Divisional Judicial Magistrates. The District Magistrate was now the main Executive Magistrate of the district - charged with taking preventive measures for maintenance of law and order. Indirectly, this led to a loss of direct control over the police which now depended on the District Judge and the Judicial Magistrates. This change was institutionalised by the Code of Criminal Procedure, 1973. In the Union Territories and the North Eastern states, Collectors continued to exercise judicial power for much longer. A separate district judiciary was not created till 1978 in Delhi, 2008 in Mizoram, 2016 in Arunachal Pradesh and 2020 in Meghalaya. South Garo Hills District in Meghalaya, the last remaining district of India with the District Magistrate also exercising judicial powers, finally got a separate District and Sessions Court on 17 December 2020.

Exception
Kolkata in West Bengal is unique in not having a conventional collector. A recently created post with the same name performs the functions of collector of stamp revenue, registration and certain other miscellaneous functions. The Magisterial powers are exercised by a Police Commissioner, one of the earliest such posts in British India, while the Kolkata Municipal Corporation takes care of all other responsibilities.

Analogous posts
At the time of Partition of India, the Indian Civil Service was divided between India and Pakistan. The institution of the DC/DM remained the same in both the countries till the 2001 Devolution of Powers Scheme of President Pervez Musharraf abolished the post of the DM in Pakistan. He was replaced by an officer called the District Coordination Officer with significantly reduced powers. After 2016, almost all Pakistani provinces have reinstated the office of the DC but without the Magistracy powers which are now exercised by the Police and Judiciary. DCs in Bangladesh, however, continue to discharge their role with only minor changes in powers and authority since independence in 1971.

See also 

 Indian Administrative Service
 Indian Police Service
 Indian Forest Service
 Chief Secretary (India)
 Principal Secretary (India)
 Divisional Commissioner
 Municipal commissioner
 Sub-Divisional Magistrate
 List of districts in India

References

Bibliography

 
 
 
 

Indian Administrative Service officers